Limoneta is a genus of African dwarf spiders that was first described by R. Bosmans & R. Jocqué in 1983.  it contains only two species, both found in Cameroon, Kenya, and South Africa: L. graminicola and L. sirimoni.

See also
 List of Linyphiidae species (I–P)

References

Araneomorphae genera
Linyphiidae
Spiders of Africa